() is a genre of accompanied vocal Japanese court music that existed during the Heian period in the Nara and Kyoto regions.

It may have developed out of music to drive horses along, as the Chinese characters that compose its name seem to indicate but, according to German musicologist Eta Harich-Schneider, there are several other theories.

Song texts are short and simple in character and describe scenes of life. The repertoire was once estimated at some 400 songs. In the late Nara period the aristocracy became more interested in complex foreign musical imports. Courtiers sang  songs for entertainment. A fashionable aristocrat was not regarded à jour if he did not know of the latest Chinese imports, such as  music. In the 14th century, because of the many wars, the repertoire of  declined, as many were lost due to the turmoil, and it was only at the crowning ceremony  of emperor Emperor Go-Mizunoo, who ruled from 1611 to 1629, at Nijo Palace that a reconstruction of the old  pieces was attempted and the famous  piece "" was performed at the Imperial palace in Kyōto.
The emperor's wife, Fujiwara no Fusahi, tells in her court chronicles how little old material could be found.  The repertoire today includes newly created folk songs, .

Text of '' (Sea of Ise)

('Near the sea at Ise we want to harvest sea-wheat, while we collect mussels and sea shells we collect pearls, I want to find one pearl.')

References

Harich-Schneider, E: Saibara, Deutsches Jahrbuch für Music, 1963,
Harich-Schneider, E: A history of Japanese Music, Oxford UP, 1980

Gagaku